Tom Burke was an Ireland international footballer.

International career
In February 1934, Burke made his only appearance for Ireland in a 4–4 draw with Belgium in Dalymount Park in a World Cup Qualifying tie.

References

Association football defenders
Republic of Ireland association footballers
Republic of Ireland international footballers
Cork F.C. players
League of Ireland players
Year of birth missing
Place of birth missing
Year of death missing